Salil al-Sawarim ("Clashing of Swords") is a nasheed (chant) produced by the Islamic State in 2014 and used in Islamist propaganda videos. It is a melodic a cappella hymn. The lyrics discuss bloodshed and war.

The song was produced by the Ajnad Foundation, with the recitation of the vocalist Abu Yassir, the most well known vocalist of the group. Salil al-Sawarim is among the best known IS nasheeds. It appeared in IS' fourth installment of the Salil al-Sawarim video series, which among other things contain medleys of executions.

See also  
 Dawlat al-Islam Qamat, an unofficial anthem of IS

References

External links 
Listen to Salil al-Sawarim at the Internet Archive

Islamic State of Iraq and the Levant mass media
Anthems
Nasheeds
2014 poems

fr:Salil al-Sawarim